is a Japanese actor represented by Watanabe Entertainment.

Filmography

Stage Play
 ROMEO×JULIET〜legend of painful heart (2011)
 THE BUTTERFLY EFFECT CHRONICLE "Blood Heaven 〜Seventh Heaven~" (2011) - Rudge
 Benibara Rabbit Team Vol.9 "Mr.Professor Dangerous Masquerade" (2012)
 Musical "Hakuoki" - Nagakura Shinpachi
 Saito version (2012)
 Okita Souji version (2013)
 Hijikata Toshizo version (2013)
 HAKU-MYU LIVE (2014)
 Kazama Chikage version (2014)
 Todo Heisuke version (2015)
 abc★ Akasaka Boys Cabaret - Third part - Jibun ni katsu wo irete katsu!~ (2012) - Kido Teruaki
 Stage play "Tono to Issho" (2012) - Date Masamune
 Stage play "Yowamushi Pedal" - Shinkai Hayato
 Hakone Academy Chapter ~Sleeping Straight-Line Demon~ (2013)
 Inter High Chapter: The First Result (2013)
 Inter High Chapter: The Second Order (2014)
 Hakone Academy Chapter ~The Beast's Awakening~ The Beast on the Road (2014)
 Inter High Chapter: The WINNER (2015)
 Hakone Academy New Generation, Start (2016)
 Tokyo Sundance (2013) - Keizo
 At that time at Penny Lane (2014) - Akira
 Neverland (2014) - Cubby
 Messiah Project - Takano Yuta
 Shibi no Sho (2014)
 Hagane no Sho (2015)
 Reading play "My plan of marrying a rich man" (2014) - Orus
 Gokujo Bungaku "Run, Melos!" (2014) - Melos
 Stage play "BOYS★TALK" Second edition (2014) - Shuuto
 Stage play "Tokyo Ghoul" (2015) - Nagachika Hideyoshi
 Reading play "My and that guy's Sekigahara" (2015) - Ishida Mitsunari/ Tokugawa Ieyasu
 Reading play "Me and your summer battle formation" (2015) - Tokugawa Ieyasu/ Toyotomi Hideyoshi/ others
 D stage 17 - Yuhiden (2015) - Tsuzuki
 AGAPE store "The Seven Secrets" (2016) - Suzuki
 7th Anniversary Special Performance "Retired Lily" (2016) - Makoto
 Stage play "Fairy Tail" (2016) - Natsu Dragneel
 Stage play "Blue Exorcist" - Okumura Yukio
 Kyoto Crimson Chapter (2016)
 Illuminati Chapter (2017)
 bpm EXTRA STAGE "ESORA" (2017) - Walt Burton
 D stage 20 " Judo boys" (2017) - Miyazaki Shuuto
 Dansui! (2017) - Shinozuka Daiki
 Picaresque Seven (2017) - Tokugawa Iemitsu
 Stage play "Otamajakushi" (2018) - Akinori
 PHOTOGRAPH51 (2018) - Watson
 Ahead of the light~runners at dawn (2018) - Tsuburaya Kokichi
 Music play "Maniac" (2019)
 COCOON - Tsuki no Kageri (2019) - Emil Bard
 COCOON - Hoshi Hitotsu (2019) - Ul de Rico
 Hamlet (2019) - Horatio
 Stupid wanderer (2019) - Sukapin
 Winter era (2020) - Hyofu
 The Great War of Archimedes (2020) - Takana Shojiro (performances cancelled due to Covid-19)
 STAGE GATE VR Theater - vol. 1 "Defiled" (2020) - Harry Mendelssohn
 Night on the Galactic Railroad (2020)

Movies
 The Castle of Crossed Destinies (2012)
 Killing Curriculum - The Werewolf Game - Prologue (2015) - Takiguchi Hiroki
 Messiah - Shinku no Sho (2015) - Takano Yuta
 Shashin Koshien Summer in 0.5 Seconds (2017) - Fujisaki Daisuke
 Shinjuku Punch (2018) - Shitara Gen
 Chotto matte Yakyuubu (2018) - Hinohara Go
 Meiji Tokyo Renka (2019) - Mori Ogai
 Kiss Him, Not Me (2020) - Serinuma Takuro
 Two Outs Bases Loaded (2022)

Television
 Mischievous Kiss - Love in Tokyo (2013) - Narazaki Nobu
 Messiah - Eisei no Sho (2015) - Takano Yuta
 Yowamushi Pedal - Season 1 (2016) - Shinkai Hayato
 Dansui! (2017) - Shinozuka Daiki
 Yowamushi Pedal - Season 2 (2017) - Shinkai Hayato
 I'm sailing seriously - Second Season (2018) - Kisaragi Kira
 Ishinomori Shotaro, the man who created the hero (2018) - Suzuki Shinichi
 Meiji Tokyo Renka (2019) - Mori Ogai
 Swallow detective (2019) - Hata
 Tales of the Unusual (2020) - Nojima Shinichiro
 Detective Novice - Midnight Runner (2020) - Saotome

Anime
 Tokyo Ghoul (2014) - Ichimi
 Tokyo Ghoul:re (2018) - Ichimi

Others
 SONY PCL 3D short movie - "Believers" - Eiji
 YouTube Dai7sedaijikkenshitsu playthemoment "Richard III" (2020) - Buckingham

References

External links
Miyazaki Shuuto Official profile
宮崎秋人 (@shuto_mi) on Twitter
宮崎秋人 (shuto_miyazaki) on Instagram
Miyazaki Shuuto Official Blog "I'm no one"

1990 births
Living people
21st-century Japanese male actors